Corry is an unincorporated community in Dade County, in the U.S. state of Missouri.

History
Corry was laid out in 1875 as "Cora", and named after Cora Alexander, the daughter of an early settler (a recording error accounts for the error in spelling, which was never corrected).  A post office called Corry was established in 1876, and remained in operation until 1907.

References

Unincorporated communities in Dade County, Missouri
Unincorporated communities in Missouri